Plan B Advertising is an independent, full-service advertising, marketing and creative agency headquartered in Chicago's River North neighborhood. 

In 1999, advertising industry veterans Ric Van Sickle, Clay Cooper, and Don Weaver left the "big agency" world to found Plan B as an on-demand, results-driven "Agency Alternative." Plan B now has offices in Chicago, New Orleans, and San Francisco servicing a wide array of clients in diverse industries, ranging from automotive to health and fitness to technology and more. The agency brands itself as a "best-gen agency marketing agency with a talent for pushing boundaries ... that thinks beyond advertising as it's traditionally been defined."  

The agency's capabilities include Strategy, Creative, Social Media, Event Support & Management, Website Development, CRM, Production, Performance & Analytics, and Media Planning.  

In 2017, Plan B launched HauteRod, an automotive event management company that specializes in show events, track events, test-driving events, vintage events, virtual events, brand training and more. 

In 2009, Plan B was the first agency to offer an inside look at the office with video chat webcams at their desks, allowing completely transparent communication.

Clients & Awards
Plan B services a varied roster of clients, including McLaren Automotive, Keiser Fitness, Culligan Water, Atturo Tires, Loyola Medicine, Wilson, Hanesbrands, Jaguar NA, Volvo, Zip Water U.S., Tru Vue, Mather, S&C Electric, Kennicott Bros., Papermate, and Allied Van Lines.

Plan B has won several awards, including:
National ADDY Award, Fort Wayne ADDY Award,
Print Magazine Regional Design Annual Competition,
Chicago Addy Award,
One Show Award,
DMA/Echo Award,
and a Golden Hammer Award.

References

External links
 * AgencyCompile.com

Advertising agencies of the United States
Companies based in Chicago
Marketing companies established in 1999
1999 establishments in Illinois